Ágnes Ferencz (born October 11, 1956 in Budapest) is a Hungarian sport shooter. She competed in pistol shooting events at the Summer Olympics in 1988 and 1992.

Olympic results

References

External links 
 
 
 
 

1956 births
Living people
ISSF pistol shooters
Hungarian female sport shooters
Shooters at the 1988 Summer Olympics
Shooters at the 1992 Summer Olympics
Olympic shooters of Hungary
Sport shooters from Budapest